Quebecoceras is an extinct genus from the nautiloid order Ellesmerocerida that lived during the Gasconadian Stage at the beginning of the Early Ordovician.

Quebecoceras is a cyrtoconic, similar to Dakeoceras and Paradakeoceras except for having a circular cross section and more persistent curvature and rate of expansion. Paradakeoceras differs in having a somewhat flattened venter.

The only known species, Quebecoceras quebecense,  is half again a large as the largest known Dakeoceras, making it a fairly large ellesmeroceratid genus.

See also

List of nautiloids

References

 Flower, R.H. 1964. The Nautiloid Order Ellesmerocerida (Cephalopoda); Memoir 12, New Mexico Bureau of Mines and Mineral Resources, Socorro N.M. 
 W. M. Furnish & Brian F. Glenister, 1964.  Nautiloidia—Ellesmerocerida. Treatise on Invertebrate Paleontology, Part K. Geological Society of America, Teichert and Moore (eds).  
 Sepkoski, J.J. Jr. 2002. A compendium of fossil marine animal genera. D.J. Jablonski & M.L. Foote (eds.). Bulletins of American Paleontology 363: 1–560. Sepkoski's Online Genus Database (CEPHALOPODA)

Prehistoric nautiloid genera
Monotypic mollusc genera
Ordovician cephalopods
Ellesmerocerida